The 2023 Pennsylvania elections will take place on , to fill judicial positions, allow judicial retention votes, and fill numerous county, local and municipal offices, the most prominent being the Mayor of Philadelphia. The necessary primary elections will be held in May 2023. In addition, special elections for legislative vacancies could be held at various times in 2023.

Justice of the Supreme Court 

Democratic primary

Candidates 
 Deborah Kunselman, Judge of the Superior Court of Pennsylvania (2018–present)
 Daniel McCaffery, Judge of the Superior Court of Pennsylvania (2020–present), U.S. Army veteran

Endorsements

Results

Republican primary

Candidates 
 Carolyn Carluccio, Judge of the Montgomery County Court of Common Pleas (2009–present)
 Patricia McCullough, Judge of the Pennsylvania Commonwealth Court (2010–present) and candidate for supreme court in 2021

Withdrawn
 Paula Patrick, Judge of the Philadelphia County Court of Common Pleas (2003–present) and candidate for supreme court in 2021

Endorsements

Results

General election

Results

Judge of the Superior Court 

Republican primary

Candidates 
 Maria Battista, former Clarion County Assistant District Attorney
 Harry Smail Jr., Judge of the Westmoreland County Court of Common Pleas (2014–present)

Withdrawn
 Michael Dimino, Professor at Widener University Commonwealth Law School
 Emily Yuhaniak

Endorsements

Results

Democratic primary

Candidates 
 Jill Beck, civil litigator at Blank Rome, candidate for Superior Court of Pennsylvania in 2021
 Patrick Dugan, Judge of the Philadelphia Municipal Court (2007–present)
 Timika Lane, Judge of the Philadelphia County Court of Common Pleas, Democratic nominee for Superior Court of Pennsylvania in 2021

Endorsements

Results

General election

Results

Judge of the Commonwealth Court 
One vacancy occurred when Justice P. Kevin Brobson was elected to the Supreme Court of Pennsylvania in 2021.

Republican primary

Candidates 
 Megan Martin, Secretary-Parliamentarian of the Pennsylvania State Senate (2012–2022)
 Joshua Prince, associate at Prince Law Offices, P.C.

Endorsements

Results

Democratic primary

Candidates
Bryan Neft, former president of the Allegheny County Bar Association’s Board of Governors, candidate for Superior Court of Pennsylvania in 2021
Matthew S. Wolf, supervising Judge of the Philadelphia Municipal Court (2018–present)

Withdrawn
Brandon Neuman,  Judge of the Washington County Court of Common Pleas (2018–present) and former state representative (2011–2017)

Results

General election

Results

Judicial retention

Judge of the Superior Court 
President Judge Jack A. Panella (D) and Judge Victor P. Stabile (R) are scheduled for retention votes in 2023. Both have informed the Pennsylvania Department of State that they will seek retention.

Municipal elections

Philadelphia

Mayor

City Council

City Controller special election 
A special election is scheduled to take place after the resignation of City Controller Rebecca Rhynhart in October 2022 to run for Mayor.

Candidates

Declared 
 Christy Brady, Acting City Controller (2022-2023)
 Alexandra Hunt, activist and public health researcher
 Karen Javaruski, enterprise risk management professional
 Gregg Kravitz, realtor

Withdrawn 
 Jack Inacker, United States Air Force veteran and former nuclear weapons systems specialist

Allegheny County

County Executive

Ballot questions 
No ballot measures have yet been announced for 2023.

Special elections

Pennsylvania State Senate

27th senatorial district 
On , state senator John Gordner announced his resignation in order to serve as counsel to interim Senate Pro Tempore Kim Ward. Gordner's resignation was effective on November 30.

Democrats nominated speech pathologist Patricia Lawton while Republicans nominated State Representative Lynda Schlegel-Culver. Libertarians had nominated business consultant and constable Thomas Anderson, but he failed to file the necessary paperwork in time and his lawsuit for ballot access was denied by the Commonwealth Court of Pennsylvania.

Pennsylvania House of Representatives 
Three vacancies in the Pennsylvania House of Representatives opened between Election Day 2022 and the start of the 2023 session in January. The vacancies have made the difference between Democratic and Republican control, and paralyzed the chamber due to representatives’ inability to agree on basic operating rules.

32nd district 

On October 9, 2022, incumbent representative Anthony DeLuca died of lymphoma while seeking reelection. The time of his death occurred after the deadline to conduct candidate substitutions, causing his name to remain on the ballot. Despite his death, he defeated Green challenger Queonia Livingston, receiving 85% of the vote.

Democrats nominated Penn Hills Democratic Committee chair Joe McAndrew.  Republicans nominated pastor and Army veteran Clay Walker. 2022 Green Party candidate Queonia Livingston had filed nomination papers but they were rejected by the Pennsylvania Department of State.

34th district 

On On November 8, 2022, incumbent representative Summer Lee was elected to the U.S. House of Representatives in Pennsylvania's 12th congressional district, while simultaneously running unopposed for reelection to the 34th legislative district. Pennsylvania's constitution forbids General Assembly lawmakers from holding another office, but does not prevent them from running for reelection while seeking another office.

Democrats nominated Swissvale borough councilor Abigail Salisbury while Republicans nominated Robert Pagane, a kickboxing instructor.

35th district 

On January 4, 2022, incumbent representative Austin Davis announced he would be seeking the Democratic nomination for Lieutenant Governor, with Josh Shapiro's endorsement. He was nominated to be on the ticket on May 18 and was elected to the position in the general election. Davis was subsequently reelected to represent the 35th district, defeating Republican challenger Donald Nevills with 65% of the vote. Pennsylvania's constitution forbids General Assembly lawmakers from holding another office, but does not prevent them from running for reelection while seeking another office.

Democrats nominated McKeesport official Matt Gergely, brother of previous seatholder Marc Gergely. Republicans nominated their 2022 general election nominee Don Nevills.

108th district 

On , incumbent representative Lynda Schlegel-Culver was elected to Pennsylvania's 27th Senatorial district in a special election amid the resignation of Senator John Gordner. House Speaker Joanna McClinton announced a special election for May 16 in conjunction with the 2023 primary.

163rd district 

On , incumbent representative Michael Zabel resigned from the Pennsylvania House of Representatives, effective March 16, following a sexual harassment controversy. House Speaker Joanna McClinton announced a special election for May 16 in conjunction with the 2023 primary.

References

External links
Official campaign websites for Supreme Court of Pennsylvania
Carolyn Carluccio (R) for Supreme Court
Debbie Kunselman (D) for Supreme Court
Dan McCaffery (D) for Supreme Court
Official campaign websites for Superior Court of Pennsylvania
Maria Battista (R) for Superior Court
Jill Beck (D) for Superior Court
Pat Dugan (D) for Superior Court
Timika Lane (D) for Superior Court
Official campaign websites for Commonwealth Court of Pennsylvania 
Megan Martin (R) for Commonwealth Court
Bryan Neft (D) for Commonwealth Court
Joshua Prince (R) for Commonwealth Court
Matt Wolf (D) for Commonwealth Court

November 2023 events in the United States
Pennsylvania special elections
2019 Pennsylvania elections
Pennsylvania judicial elections
Pennsylvania